City on a Hill: Sing Alleluia was released in 2002. The album is the second in the City on a Hill series of compilation albums by popular contemporary Christian musicians. The album received the Gospel Music Association's Special Event Album of the Year award for 2003.

Track listing

References

External links
City on a Hill web site

Sing Alleluia
2002 compilation albums